"The Very Thought of You" is a pop standard that was recorded and published in 1934 with music and lyrics by Ray Noble. The song was first recorded by Ray Noble and His Orchestra with Al Bowlly on vocals for HMV in England in April 1934. This record was then released in the United States by Victor, and it reached number one for five weeks on the pop music charts.

The song was the subject of litigation in 1962. In 1934, Noble assigned the copyright to British publisher Campbell, Connelly & Company. Before the copyright was renewed, however, Noble assigned the United States copyright to M. Witmark & Sons. A suit was brought by Campbell, Connelly against Noble, stating that the assignment covered all rights, including rights in the USA. A British High Court judge ruled in favor of Campbell, Connelly.

Charting cover versions
 In 1946, Luis Russell recorded the song, which went to number three on the Most-Played Juke Box Race Records charts.
 A rhythm and blues version by Little Willie John reached number 61 on the US Billboard Hot 100 in 1961. 
 Three years later Ricky Nelson's rock and roll version reached No. 26 on the Billboard chart, lasting 7 weeks in the Hot 100, and crossing to No. 11 on the Billboard magazine Easy Listening chart.
 Natalie Cole reached #34 on the U.S. Adult Contemporary chart in the spring of 1992 with her version from her LP Unforgettable... with Love (1991).  In Canada, her version spent two weeks at #19 Adult Contemporary.

Covers by notable artists

 Bing Crosby (1934)
 Billie Holiday (1938)
 Doris Day (1950)
 Dizzy Gillespie (1953)
 Nat King Cole (1958)
 Dakota Staton (1960)
 Frank Sinatra (1962)

 Albert King (1967)
 Elvis Costello (1995)
 Harry Connick Jr. (2003)
 Tony Bennett with Paul McCartney (2006)
 Emilie-Claire Barlow (2007)
 Michael Bublé (2016)
 Bryan Ferry (2022)

References

1934 songs
1934 singles
1946 singles
1961 singles
1964 singles
1992 singles
1930s jazz standards

Songs written by Ray Noble
Pop standards
Al Bowlly songs
Bing Crosby songs
Billie Holiday songs
Doris Day songs
Harry Connick Jr. songs
Ricky Nelson songs
Natalie Cole songs
Sarah Vaughan songs
Vaughn Monroe songs
Elektra Records singles
Number-one singles in the United States